Zeki Önder Özen (born 17 October 1969 in Eskişehir) is a Turkish football coach and former player. He managed Bugsaş Spor and had been an assistant coach & match analyst of Fenerbahçe.

He qualified for a coaching license in 1997. He has been working forFenerbahçe and Fenerbahçe Youth Academy from January 2002 to 2008. He also managed Hacettepe Spor Kulübü in 2009–10 season. In 2012, he started to appear on Ntvspor as a commentator.

President of Beşiktaş JK, Fikret Orman made a press conference on 22 May 2013, to announce that Özen was the new Director of football of the club.

Management mentality
On 22 March 2013, Özen declared his football mentality during his presentation for Beşiktaş. For him a perfect football team should comprise 24 players, divided to three groups of eight players. According to him, first group of players must be well-experienced, international and winner. Second group of players must be local heroes, fighters and good team-workers. The last group should be formed as young, determined and disciplined players.

Managerial statistics

External links
 Fenerbahçe SK official website
 Profil on TFF.org

References

1969 births
Living people
Turkish football managers
Turkish footballers
Fenerbahçe football managers
Sportspeople from Eskişehir
Association footballers not categorized by position